The Hoplitidae is a family of Cretaceous ammonites that lived during the middle of the period from the late Aptian to the Cenomanian.  They are part of the superfamily Hoplitoidea.

Members of the Hoplitidae are typically evolute, with inner whorls exposed, although some are more involute, and are commonly stout and strongly ribbed, with pronounced tubercles.

The Hoplitidae are thought to be derived from the U Aptian -M Albian Uligella of the Desmoceratidae, or some related form and have been divided into three subfamilies.

Subtaxa
Classification of Hoplitidae was revised multiple times during last decades. Currently, is contains 3 subfamilies:

 Gastroplitinae
 Freboldiceras
 Arcthoplites
 ?Sokolovites
 Pseudopulchellia
 Gastroplites
 Irenoceras
 Neogastroplites
 ?Alopecoceras
 Sonneratiinae
 Bucaillella
 Sonneratia
 Pseudosonneratia
 Anahoplitoides
 Hemisonneratia
 Protohoplites
 Tetrahoplites
 Hoplitinae
 Otohoplites
 Hoplites
 Hoplites (Hoplites)
 Hoplites (Isohoplites)
 Anahoplites
 Dimorphoplites
 Epihoplites
 Epihoplites (Metaclavites)
 Epihoplites (Epihoplites)
 Semenoviceras
 Callihoplites
 Pleurohoplites
 Pleurohoplites (Pleurohoplites)
 Pleurohoplites (Arrhaphoceras)
 Euhoplites
 Hyphoplites
 Hyphoplites (Hyphoplites)
 Hyphoplites (Discohoplites)

Phylogenetic relations
The Hoplitidae may have given rise to the Schloenbachiidae and seems to be in a different branch of the Hoplitoidea from earlier families included.

References

 Treatise on Invertebrate Paleontology, Part L, Mollusca 4, Mesozoic Ammonoidea. R.C. Moore (ed). Geological Soc. of America and Univ Kansas Press (1957)
 Hoplitidae-Paleodb

 
Ammonitida families
Hoplitoidea
Aptian first appearances
Cenomanian extinctions